Qusay Saddam Hussein al-Nasiri al-Tikriti (or Qusai, ; 17 May 1966 – 22 July 2003) was an Iraqi politician, military leader, and the second son of Saddam Hussein.  He was appointed as his father's heir apparent in 2000. He was also in charge of the Republican Guard. Qusay and his brother Uday were killed in a U.S. raid in Mosul.

Early and personal life
Qusay was born in Baghdad in 1966 to Ba'athist revolutionary Saddam Hussein, who was in prison at the time, and his wife and cousin, Sajida Talfah. Some sources have said the birth year was 1965, while others have said it was either 1967 or 1968. He was widely described to be a family man and an attorney in training.

He married Sahar Maher Abd al-Rashid; the daughter of Maher Abd al-Rashid, a top ranking military official, and had three sons: Mustafa (3 January 1989 – 22 July 2003), Yahya Adnan (born 1991) (heir apparent of his grand father Saddam) and Saddam Ali (born 1995).

Career
Qusay reportedly played a role in crushing the Shiite uprising in the aftermath of the 1991 Gulf War and is also thought to have masterminded the destruction of the southern marshes of Iraq. The wholesale destruction of these marshes ended a centuries-old way of life that prevailed among the Shiite Marsh Arabs who made the wetlands their home, and ruined the habitat for dozens of species of migratory birds. The Iraqi government stated that the action was intended to produce usable farmland, though a number of outsiders believe the destruction was aimed against the Marsh Arabs as retribution for their participation in the 1991 uprising.

Uday was viewed as their father's heir apparent until he sustained serious injuries in a 1996 assassination attempt. Unlike Uday, who was known for extravagance and erratic, violent behavior, Qusay kept a low profile.

Iraqi dissidents claimed that Qusay was responsible for the killing of many political activists. The Sunday Times reported that Qusay Hussein ordered the killing of Khalis Mohsen al-Tikriti, an engineer at the military industrialization organization, because he believed Mohsen was planning to leave Iraq. In 1998, Iraqi opposition groups accused Qusay Hussein of ordering the execution of thousands of political prisoners after hundreds of inmates were similarly executed to make room for new prisoners in crowded jails.

Hussein's service in the Iraqi Republican Guard began around 2000. He had final say in many military decisions unless Saddam intervened.  It is believed that he became the supervisor of the Guard and the head of internal security forces (possibly the Special Security Organization (SSO)), and had authority over other Iraqi military units.

Despite his cunningness, Iraq’s defense minister Sultan Hashim Ahmad al-Tai claimed that Qusay “knew nothing [about commanding military]. He understood only simple military things like a civilian. We prepared information and advice for him and he'd accept it or not.”

Hours before the 2003 invasion of Iraq, Qusay withdrew approximately $1 billion from the central bank in Baghdad, acting on personal orders from Saddam. He arrived at the bank in Baghdad at 4am on March 18, hours before the first US strikes, seized around $900 million in $100 bills and a further $100 million in euros, loaded them into three tractor-trailers, and left.  this is recognised as the biggest bank heist in history.

Assassination attempt
On August 1, 2002, Qusay was shot by members of the Iraqi National Congress during a motorcade. He received injuries to his arm. He was said to have survived a previous assassination attempt in 2001.

Killing

Saddam Hussein's closest aide and personal secretary, Abid Hamid Mahmud, had been captured, and told his interrogators that he and Saddam's two sons had sought refuge in Syria but were turned back. According to the smuggler who took them across the border, they came again after less than 48 hours. They said to the smuggler: "A Syrian citizen will be waiting for a call from them and my mission is limited to bring them to the borders, not inside Syria." The smuggler said, "They sought refuge with some of their acquaintances near the Rabia border center, and they already reached the outskirts of the city of Aleppo, and there, after replacing the broken tires of their car, the Syrian authorities, who ordered their return to Iraq, stopped them. Abd Hammoud was not staying with them, but he visited them for four days and on the fourth day they left the house. Accompanying Abid Hamid towards Mosul, there Uday and Qusay took refuge in the house of Nawaf Al-Zaidan, joined by Mustafa Qusay, who was staying with his grandfather, Maher Abdul-Rashid. On 16 July 2003, he met with Qusay again, asked if he had an intention to get out of Iraq, to which Qusay replied, 'This is no longer possible. I will stay in Iraq awaiting the instructions of the father.' During their time at the villa, the sheikh reportedly left Uday and Qusay playing video games for weeks. Seven days later, Uday, Qusay, Qusay's 14-year-old son Mustafa, and their companion Abdul-Samad were killed." Abdul Halim Khaddam, the former vice president of Syria, revealed that his country handed over the half brother of Saddam Hussein to the American forces. They also deported the sons of the ousted president to Iraq and refused to receive the former foreign minister, Tariq Aziz.

On the afternoon of 22 July 2003, troops of the 101st Airborne 3/327th Infantry HQ and C-Company, aided by U.S. Special Forces, killed Qusay Hussein, his 14-year-old son Mustafa, his older brother Uday Hussein and a bodyguard during a raid on a house in the northern Iraqi city of Mosul. Acting on a tip provided the previous day from Nawaf al-Zaidan, an alleged cousin and friend of Saddam Hussein who had been sheltering the four in his home for numerous weeks, a special forces team attempted to apprehend everyone in the house at the time. After being fired upon, the special forces moved back and called for backup. After Task Force 121 members were wounded, the 3/327th Infantry surrounded and fired on the house with a TOW missile, Mk 19 grenade launcher, M2 machine guns and small arms. After about four hours of battle (the whole operation lasted 6 hours), the soldiers entered the house and found four dead, including the two brothers and their bodyguard. There were reports that Qusay Hussein's 14-year-old son Mustafa was the fourth body found. Brigadier general Frank Helmick, the assistant commander of 101st Airborne, commented that all occupants of the house died during the gun battle before U.S. troops were able to enter.

Soldiers, who tried to enter the house three times, encountered small arms fire and grenades in the first two attempts. Uday, Qusay, and their guard protected the street and the first floor from the bathroom at the front of the house; Qusay's son took cover from the bedroom in the back. The American forces then bombed the house many times and fired missiles. Three adults were thought to have died due to the TOW missile fired into the front of the house. In the third attempt, the soldiers killed Qusay's son after he fired at them.

Brigade commander Colonel Joe Anderson said an Arabic announcement was made at 10 A.M. on the day and called on people inside to come out peacefully. In response, the occupants opened fire. An experienced team of commandos tried to attack the building, but they had to retreat under fire. Four American soldiers were injured. Anderson then ordered his men to fire with 50-caliber heavy machine guns. Uday and Qusay Hussein refused to surrender even after a helicopter fired a rocket and the Strike Brigade fired 40mm grenades at them. The Colonel decided that more firepower was necessary to take down the brothers, leading to 12 TOW missiles being fired into the building.

After his sons' death, Saddam Hussein recorded a tape and said, "Beloved Iraqis, your brothers Uday and Qusay, and Mustafa, the son of Qusay, took a stand of faith, which pleases God, makes a friend happy, and makes an enemy angry. They stood in the arena of jihad in Mosul, after a valiant battle with the enemy that lasted six hours. The armies of aggression mobilised all types of weapons of the ground forces against them and succeeded to harm them only when they used planes against the house where they were. Thus, they adopted a stand with which God has honoured this Hussein family so that the present would be a continuation of the brilliant, genuine, faithful, and honourable past. We thank God for what he has ordained for us when he honoured us with their martyrdom for his sake. We ask Almighty God to satisfy them and all the righteous martyrs after they satisfied him with their faithful Jihadist stand. Had Saddam Hussein had 100 children, other than Uday and Qusay, Saddam Hussein would have sacrificed them on the same path. God honoured us by their martyrdom. If you had killed Uday, Qusay, Mustafa, and another mujahideen man with them, all the youths of our nation and the youths of Iraq are Uday, Qusay, and Mustafa in the fields of jihad."

On 23 July 2003, the American command stated that it had conclusively identified two of the dead men as Saddam Hussein's sons from dental records. Because many Iraqis were skeptical of news of the deaths, the U.S. Government released photos of the corpses and allowed Iraq's governing council to identify the bodies despite the U.S. objection to the publication of American corpses on Arab television. Both brothers had grown long beards to avoid detection. Afterwards, their bodies were reconstructed by morticians. For example, Qusay Hussein's beard was shaved and gashes from the battle were removed. Qusay Hussein was the ace of clubs in the coalition forces' most-wanted Iraqi playing cards. His father was the ace of spades and his brother was the ace of hearts.

The U.S. government also announced that the informant (possibly the owner of the villa, Nawaf al-Zaidan, in Mosul in which the brothers were killed) would receive the combined $30 million reward previously offered for their apprehension.

Qusay Hussein's other two sons, Yahya Qusay and Yaqub Qusay, are presumed alive, but their whereabouts are unknown.

In 2017, his nephew Massoud claimed his body was stolen by the Iranian government although this was unproven.

References

External links

BBC News: Saddam's rival sons, 10 September 2002
BBC News: Saddam's hated sons, 23 July 2003

1965 births
2003 deaths
Deaths by firearm in Iraq
People of the 1991 uprisings in Iraq
Tulfah family
Members of the Regional Command of the Arab Socialist Ba'ath Party – Iraq Region
Most-wanted Iraqi playing cards
Sons of national leaders
Iraqi military personnel killed in action
Military personnel killed in action in the Iraq War
Iraqi Sunni Muslims
People from Tikrit
Iraqi Arab nationalists
Assassinated Iraqi politicians
Assassinations in Iraq
Fugitives